Jordan Kerr and Jim Thomas were the defending champions, but lost in the first round this year.

Paul Hanley and Graydon Oliver won the title, defeating Simon Aspelin and Todd Perry, who retired from the final with Hanley and Oliver leading 6–2, 3–1.

Seeds

Draw

Draw

References
Draw

2005 ATP Tour
Doubles